Lilian De Beaurepaire (15 September 1892 – 24 November 1979), also known by her married name Lilian Clarke, was an Australian swimmer and diver. She competed at the 1920 Summer Olympics in the 100-metre and 400-mete freestyle and plain high diving, but failed to reach the finals.  Her brother Frank Beaurepaire was an Olympic swimmer.

She was the daughter of  Francis Edmund de Beaurepaire, sailor, tram-conductor, trader, and (later) hotel proprietor, and his wife Mary Edith, née Inman. In 1936, she married Herbert Clarke.

The Lillian Beaurepaire Memorial Swimming Pool on the  Lorne foreshore was opened by Melbourne City Councillor Ian Beaurepaire CMG in December 1967. For many years she was Lorne's only lifesaver. 
 
She died on 24 November 1979 at Chesterfield Private Hospital, Geelong.

References

External links
 Lily Beaurepaire – Olympic athlete profile at the Australian Olympic Committee
Lily Beaurepaire – Olympic athlete profile at Sports-Reference.com

1892 births
1979 deaths
Australian female divers
Australian female freestyle swimmers
Divers at the 1920 Summer Olympics
Olympic divers of Australia
Olympic swimmers of Australia
Swimmers at the 1920 Summer Olympics
Australian surf lifesavers
19th-century Australian women
20th-century Australian women
Divers from Melbourne
Australian people of French descent
People from Albert Park, Victoria
Swimmers from Melbourne